Lake Oku is a crater lake on the Bamenda Plateau in the Northwest Region of Cameroon.

The lake is the subject of many myths among the local people.

The lake is the only known habitat of the Lake Oku Clawed Frog. The surrounding Kilum-Ijim Forest is a nature reserve, set up by BirdLife International, and home to many rare species.

See also
 Lake Barombi Koto
 Lake Barombi Mbo
 Lake Bermin
 Lake Dissoni
 Lake Ejagham

References

Oku
Northwest Region (Cameroon)
Oku